Ernst August Wagner (22 September 1874 – 27 April 1938) was a German mass murderer who, on 4 September 1913 killed his wife and four children in Degerloch. He subsequently drove to Mühlhausen an der Enz where he set several fires and shot 20 people, of whom at least nine died, before he was beaten unconscious by furious villagers and left for dead.

He was  the first person in Württemberg to be found not guilty by reason of insanity after several psychiatric assessments diagnosed him with  paranoia. He was brought to an asylum in Winnenthal, where later he wrote several plays and dramas. He died there of tuberculosis in 1938.

Life

Ernst August Wagner was born on 22 September 1874 in Eglosheim near Ludwigsburg as the ninth of ten children, as well as one half-brother and half-sister. Most of his siblings died early, so that in 1913 only two sisters and one brother remained. After his father, a poor peasant with drinking problems, died one day before Ernst Wagner's second birthday, the indebted family was forced to sell their farm. His mother tried to make a living by running a small shop; she soon remarried, but due to Mrs. Wagner's many affairs, the marriage ended in divorce when Ernst was seven years old.

Ernst Wagner, who was known as the "widow's boy" in the village, had depression and suicidal thoughts, though he was quite intelligent and did well enough at school to earn a public stipend.  In this way, despite his poverty, he was able to study and become a teacher. After his qualifying exam, he worked as an auxiliary teacher at several schools in Württemberg from 1894 to 1901, though in April 1900 he was suspended for six months because of "severe nervousness and irritability". He then went to Switzerland for two months, where he tried to sell some of his poems to newspapers.

In July 1901, Wagner was assigned a teaching position in Mühlhausen an der Enz, where he stayed until 1902. Sometime in the summer of 1901, while drunk, he sodomized an animal. He then became increasingly wary and suspicious that others might be aware of his deed, and began to see signs and hints that the villagers of Mühlhausen were mocking him for this act of bestiality. For this reason, he bought a revolver, which he always carried with him from that point on so that he could evade a potential arrest.

That same year, Wagner began an affair with Anna Friedericke Schlecht, the daughter of a local innkeeper.  He hated the Schlecht family, thinking that his future father-in-law despised him, and tried to avoid marrying Anna, but marriage became a foregone conclusion when she became pregnant by him and gave birth to a daughter, Klara, in the spring of 1902.

In December 1902, Wagner's mother, to whom he felt deeply attached, died. He took his final examination as a teacher and was transferred to Radelstetten, a poor and isolated village. Although he was embittered to be ordered to such a place, it also temporarily eased his feelings of constant persecution, even though the incident of sodomy continued to haunt him. On December 29, 1903, he and Anna Schlecht married in Ludwigsburg, mostly due to pressure from outside, as their daughter Klara was already ten months old.  However, he neither loved his wife nor feigned love, and while he treated her kindly, he considered her more of a servant because of her intellectual inferiority.

In the summer of 1904 he once again went to Switzerland, trying twice to commit suicide there, once by drowning himself and by jumping off a bridge, though both attempts failed, because he was, according to his own words, too weak. In the following years his wife bore four more children, concluding in July 1909 with Rudolph Alfred. Wagner was said to have been unhappy about the births of his children and complained about the financial stress of feeding his family; he was seemingly indifferent to the interruption of his birthday in 1909 by infant Rudolph's death.

Some time in 1906 or 1907, thinking that the people from Mühlhausen had passed on their knowledge about his crime, the feelings of being ridiculed and watched by others returned, and as a consequence he began to make plans to take revenge on those whom he deemed to be the cause of his misery, the villagers, and especially the men, of Mühlhausen. In autumn 1907 he bought the first Mauser pistol, the other one following in 1909 and, with his bicycle, which he loved more than anyone or anything else, he made extensive journeys through the surrounding area and sharpened his shooting skills in remote forests.

Between 1909 and 1911 he made several requests to be transferred to another school, which was finally granted, so that on 1 May 1912 he began his work at a school in Degerloch, a suburb of Stuttgart. At that time he also decided to go ahead with his plan to avenge the derision he had to endure, as even at his new workplace he saw hints of people "knowing", and initially chose the spring of 1913 to put it into practice, but finally determined the last days of the summer holidays for his revenge. In the days leading to the murders he wrote several letters to explain his deed.

Family murders
Wagner began his killing spree on 4 September 1913 at about 5 a.m., when he knocked his sleeping wife unconscious by hitting her on the head with a blackjack, before stabbing her numerous times in her throat and chest with a dagger, cutting her carotid arteries and hitting her heart and lungs. Afterwards he successively entered the bedrooms of his two sons, Robert and Richard, and his daughters, Klara and Elsa, and stabbed each of them in their throat and chest. Wagner initially claimed that he had also hit his children with the blackjack, though later he was uncertain of this. All of his victims died of massive haemorrhaging.

After covering his family members' bodies with blankets, Wagner got out of his blood-soaked nightshirt and washed himself, before packing a bag with three guns (two Mauser C96 and a small revolver), 500 rounds of ammunition, a black veil from his wife and a belt. He subsequently left his home, leaving a note at his own door that the family was jaunting to Ludwigsburg, as well as another one at the door of Mrs Stepper, the proprietor of the house he was living in, ordering milk and leaving behind 35 pfennige as payment.

With his cycle he then rode towards Stuttgart and took a train to Ludwigsburg, where he bought a backpack, before making his way to his brother's home in Eglosheim, arriving there at about 11 a.m.

As his brother was not at home, Wagner chatted a while with his wife, telling her he wanted to spend the night at their home after fetching his children from Mühlhausen, and, as it could get late, the house should stay accessible to him during the night. In an unobserved moment he hid 228 rounds in a haystack in the garden. Wagner, accompanied by his nephew and niece, walked to the next train station, where he took a train to Bietigheim at about 1 p.m. From there he took off towards Großsachsenheim, where he mailed letters to several people, among them some of his relatives (one of them, addressed to his sister, simply reading "Take poison! Ernst" (Nimm Gift! Ernst)) and theologist and philosopher Christoph Schrempf, as well as a newspaper. Subsequently, he returned to Bietigheim, where he got his bicycle checked by a mechanic and mailed two copies of his autobiography, one again to Christoph Schrempf. At about 7 p.m. he left for Mühlhausen an der Enz.

Shooting spree

Wagner reached the hills near Mühlhausen at about 11 p.m., where he girdled himself with the belt, put a cap on his head and took the two Mauser C96s, as well as a handbag containing ammunition, the black veil and a file. His bicycle and the small revolver were later found hidden in a corn field. Next Wagner set out to cut the telephone lines to the village, but as the poles looked too high to him and due to heavy rain that had set in by that time, he dropped that part of his plan and immediately went into Mühlhausen, where he set fire to four barns. The lower part of his face hidden with the veil he began walking through the streets, shooting at any male person that crossed his path. Wagner later claimed that his female victims were accidentally hit.

In total he spent about 80 rounds and shot 20 people, instantly killing eight of them, as well as two animals, and several buildings burned to the ground, before the villagers, with help of the military, managed to extinguish the fires. A ninth person, Jakob Knötzele, was mortally wounded and died a few hours after the shooting had ended. At one point Wagner forgot to reload his weapons and thus three men were able to strike him down with hoes and sabres. He suffered several wounds in his face and right hand, and his left hand was smashed and nearly cut off. Knocked unconscious, he was disarmed and left for dead, but at 2 a.m. a police officer found him lying on the street, still breathing. When he regained consciousness, Wagner immediately confessed to killing his family, and stated that he would have committed suicide in the end, but as this was now impossible, he would appreciate if he'd be sentenced to death and decapitated.

Finally, in the evening of 5 September, Wagner, who uttered concerns that he might get ill if he'd stay too long in Mühlhausen, was brought to a hospital in Vaihingen, where his left forearm was amputated and his other wounds treated.

Victims

See also
Bremen school shooting, another German mass shooting by a teacher committed the same year

Literature 
all in German
 Foerster, Klaus (Hrsg.): Wahn und Massenmord. Perspektiven und Dokumente zum Fall Wagner. Verlag Sindlinger-Burchartz, Frickenhausen 1999, .
 van Raden, Rolf: Patient Massenmörder. Der Fall Ernst Wagner und die biopolitischen Diskurse. Unrast-Verlag, Münster 2009,  (Edition DISS Bd. 25)
 Blom, Philipp: Der taumelnde Kontinent – Europa 1900–1914. München: Carl Hanser-Verlag 2009, S. 421-452 (chapter: 1913 – Wagners Wahn).

References

External links
Mad teacher kills 15, wounds 16, The New York Times (September 6, 1913)
Man who slew 15 insane, The New York Times (February 5, 1914)
Massenmörder Wagner irrsinnig, Vorarlberger Volksblatt (February 6, 1914)
Mass Murder - The Wagner Case
Der Massenmord in Mühlhausen - Die Beerdigung der Opfer, Reichspost (September 9, 1913)
Die Bluttat des Lehrers Wagner - Das letzte Verhör mit dem Mörder, Die Neue Zeitung (10 September 1913)
 Ernst Wagner - Ein Lehrer, Dichter und Massenmörder
 Vom grausamen Mörder zum Dichter , Landesarchiv Baden-Württemberg (May 2, 2005)

1874 births
1913 murders in Germany
1938 deaths
1910s mass shootings in Europe
20th-century deaths from tuberculosis
20th-century German dramatists and playwrights
Criminals from Baden-Württemberg
Familicides
German arsonists
German male dramatists and playwrights
German mass murderers
German murderers of children
German spree killers
Mass murder in 1913
People acquitted by reason of insanity
People from Ludwigsburg
Spree shootings in Germany
Stabbing attacks in Germany
Tuberculosis deaths in Germany